

Arabic world
Pre-Islamic poetry at its height as the Arabic language emerges as a literary language.

Poets
 'Abid ibn al-Abras, (d. 554)
 Samaw'al ibn 'Adiya (d. c. 560)
 'Alqama ibn 'Abada
 Maymun Ibn Qays Al-a'sha (570–625)
 al-Nabighah al-Dhubyani
 Amr ibn Kulthum ( - c. 584?) 
 Antarah ibn Shaddad (525–608) 
 Asma bint Marwan
 Harith Ibn Hilliza Ul-Yashkuri (approx.)
 Imru' al-Qais flourished mid-century; purported inventor of the Qasida form
 Ka'b bin Zuhayr flourished during the time of Mohammed, son of Zuhayr
 Labīd (560–661)
 Samaw'al ibn 'Adiya (d. c. 560), a Jewish poet writing in Arabic
 Tarafah ibn al 'Abd
 Zuhayr (520–609), Arabic pre-Islamic poet, father of Ka'b bin Zuhayr

Works

Europe

Poets
Listed in order by year of birth, if known or estimated:
 Aneirin, a Brythonic Bard, flourishes in Cumbria toward the end of the century
 Arator, of Liguria, writing in Latin
 Sigisteus, Vandal count, patron of Parthenius and a poet himself 
 Parthenius, patronized by the Vandal Count Sigisteus
 Jacob of Serugh (451 – Nov. 521), writing in Syriac
 Blossius Aemilius Dracontius (c. 455 – c. 505) of Carthage, a Latin poet 
 Magnus Felix Ennodius (474 – July 17, 521), Bishop of Pavia and poet, writing in Latin
 Coluthus of Lycopolis (fl. 491-518), writing in Greek
 Venantius Fortunatus (c. 530 – c. 600), Latin poet and hymnodist from Northern Italy
 Myrddin Wyllt (later 6th century?), semi- (or wholly) legendary Welsh poet and prophet living in Scotland
 Taliesin (c. 534 – c. 599), the earliest definitely identified Welsh poet
 Chilperic I (c. 539 – September 584) Frankish king of Neustria and a Latin poet
 Saint Columbanus (c. 543–615), Hiberno-Latin poet and writer

Works
Taliesin (c. 534 – c. 599), whose work has survived in a Middle Welsh manuscript, the Book of Taliesin.
 544 – Arator declaims his poem De Actibus Apostolorum in the Church of San Pietro-in-Vinculi

Byzantine Empire

Poets
 Musaeus
 Agathias (c. 536–582/594)
 Paulus Silentiarius (died 575–580),
 Romanos the Melodist (approx.)
 Procopius (c. 500–565)

South Asia

Poets
 Dandi, writing in Sanskrit (approx.)

East Asia

Poets
 Su Xiaoxiao (died 501), famous Chinese courtesan and poet. Famous for writing the poem of Xhue Cheng.

Timeline
 500 – Procopius born about this year (died 565)
 501 Su Xiaoxiao died, famous Chinese courtesan and poet
 505 – Blossius Aemilius Dracontius born about this year (born 455) of Carthage, a Latin poet 
 520 – Zuhayr born (died 609), Arabic pre-Islamic poet
 521 
 July 17 – Magnus Felix Ennodius died (born 474 – July 17, 521), Bishop of Pavia and poet, writing in Latin
 November – Jacob of Serugh died (born 451), writing in Syriac
 525 – Antarah ibn Shaddad born (died 608) Arabic poet and warrior from Najd 
 530 – Venantius Fortunatus born (c. 530 – c. 600), Latin poet and hymnodist from Northern Italy
 534 – Taliesin born about this year (died c. 599), the earliest identified Welsh poet
 536 – Agathias born about this year (died 582/594); Ancient Greek poet and historian 
 539 – Chilperic I born (died September 584) Frankish king of Neustria and a Latin poet
 543 – Saint Columbanus (died 615), Hiberno-Latin poet and writer
 544 – Arator declaims his poem De Actibus Apostolorum in the Church of San Pietro-in-Vinculi
 554 – 'Abid ibn al-Abris died about this year; Arabic poet
 560:
 Samaw'al ibn 'Adiya died about this year; Jewish poet writing in Arabic
 Labīd born this year (died 661); Arabic poet
 565 – Procopius died (born about 500)
 570 – Maymun Ibn Qays Al-a'sha born (died 625)
 584 
 (September) – Chilperic I died (born 539) Frankish king of Neustria and a Latin poet
 Amr ibn Kulthum died about this year; Arabic poet
 599 – Taliesin died about this year (born c. 534), the earliest identified Welsh poet

Decades and years

References

6th-century poems
06
Poetry